William Watt (1886 – 25 October 1957) was an Irish athlete. He competed in the men's long jump at the 1908 Summer Olympics, representing Great Britain.

References

1886 births
1957 deaths
Athletes (track and field) at the 1908 Summer Olympics
British male long jumpers
Irish male long jumpers
Olympic athletes of Great Britain
Place of birth missing